The Commons Act 1236 (20 Hen 3 c 4) was an Act of the Parliament of England. It was chapter 4 of the Statute of Merton.

The whole Chapter, in so far as it extended to Northern Ireland, was repealed by section 1 of, and Schedule 1 to, the Statute Law Revision Act 1950.

The whole Act was repealed by section 1 of, and Schedule 1 to, the Statute Law Revision Act 1953.

See also
Commons Act

References
Halsbury's Statutes,

External links

Acts of the Parliament of England
1230s in law
1236 in England
Common land in England